Brenda Bryant is a Canadian North American champion bridge player.

Bridge accomplishments

Wins
 North American Bridge Championships (1)
 Whitehead Women's Pairs (1) 2022

Personal life
Bryant has a Phd in psychology from Michigan State.

Bryant started the first Masters of Social Justice at Marygrove College. Bryant now teaches at Wayne State in Detroit.

References

Canadian contract bridge players
Living people
Michigan State University alumni
Wayne State University faculty
Year of birth missing (living people)